It Felt Like Love is a 2013 independent drama film, the first feature film directed by Eliza Hittman. It premiered at the Sundance Film Festival and was later acquired by Variance Films, receiving a limited theatrical release in March 2014. The film follows the coming-of-age of teenager Lila as she riskily courts the attentions of an older boy.

Plot
Lila, a fourteen-year-old girl who lives in Brooklyn with her widowed father, wants to be like her more sexually experienced friend Chiara. Lila and Chiara are in the same dance class and are spending the summer preparing for a big performance. Although Chiara is more experienced, she has only made it to third base with her boyfriend Patrick. Lila likes to portray herself as similarly experienced, when in reality her primary exposure to sex is tagging along on Chiara and Patrick's outings and being an awkward bystander to the couple's PDA.   One day at the beach, Lila makes eye contact with the older and tough Sammy. Hearing that Sammy is the type of guy who will "sleep with anyone," Lila aggressively pursues Sammy, going to the arcade where he works and telling friends she is in a relationship with him. Sammy is clearly not interested in Lila and sees her as just a kid, but he does not outright reject her advances, either.

Lila increasingly puts herself in dangerously vulnerable situations in order to get Sammy's attention. She goes alone to Sammy's apartment, where Sammy is hanging out with his male friends as porn plays on the TV. At one point, Sammy's friends start making crude jokes about Lila giving all of the guys simultaneous oral sex. Lila, naive and hungry for male attention, goes along with the jokes. After this scene, Lila is shown taking a bus back to her home. The question of whether Lila actually did anything sexual with the guys is left open to interpretation. The film ends with the performance of Lila and Chiara's dance team, with visuals that underscore the rocky terrain of adolescence.

Cast
 Gina Piersanti as Lila
 Giovanna Salimeni as Chiara
 Ronen Rubinstein as Sammy
Kevin Anthony Ryan as Lila's father
 Jesse Cordasco as Patrick
 Nicolas Rosen as Devon
 Case Prime as Nate

Production 
Hittman utilized the microblogging website Tumblr as part of the casting process for the film. Filming took place in the summer of 2012, lasting 18 days with a crew of 11 people.

Release
It Felt Like Love premiered at the 2013 Sundance Film Festival, and subsequently screened at such festivals as International Film Festival Rotterdam, Maryland Film Festival and Giffoni Film Festival. It was acquired by Variance Films in November 2013 for a limited theatrical release on March 21, 2014. The film was released on video by Kino Lorber on July 29, 2014.

Reception 
It Felt Like Love received critical acclaim. On review aggregator website Rotten Tomatoes, the film has an approval rating of 84% based on 25 reviews. Writing for The New York Times, Jeannette Catsoulis said the film is "a mood poem to summer loving and sexual awakening...powerfully [evoking] a time when flesh is paramount, and peer behavior is the standard by which we judge our own". She noted Hittman and cinematographer Sean Porter "remind us of the dangers of teenage desire and...the vast gulf between male and female notions of romantic connection".

Of the film, Inkoo Kang of the Los Angeles Times said, "Rarely has the zone between girlhood and womanhood been captured with such urgent honesty than in Eliza Hittman’s superb teen drama...Hittman’s debut isn’t just a brilliantly tactile study of the mounting sexual curiosity and frustration of 14-year-old Lila (Gina Piersanti); it’s also an important landmark in the oft-ignored subgenre of realistic movies about female adolescence".

Writing for RogerEbert.com, Matt Zoller Seitz praised the film as "tremendously accomplished", but also said the film falls short of a fuller character study.

References

External links
 
 
 
 New Yorker'''s Richard Brody discusses It Felt Like Love'' at Maryland Film Festival 2013
 

2013 films
American independent films
Films directed by Eliza Hittman
Variance Films films
2013 independent films
2013 directorial debut films
2013 drama films
Films produced by Shrihari Sathe
Juvenile sexuality in films
Films about adolescence
2010s coming-of-age drama films
Films set in Brooklyn
Films about puberty
2010s English-language films
2010s American films